Bird scarers is a blanket term used to describe devices designed for deterring birds by startling, confusing or otherwise repeling them, typically employed in commercial settings by farmers to dissuade birds from consuming and defecating on recently planted arable crops. Numerous bird scarers are also readily available to the public direct to consumer, or by means of purchase from independent retailers.

Bird scarers are also often present on airfields to prevent birds from accumulating in proximity to runways and causing a potential hazard to the bird and/or aircraft as well as potentially increasing the frequency an airstrip requires maintenance, and wind turbines.

Visual scarers

Scarecrow
One of the oldest designs of bird scarer is the scarecrow which is in the shape of a human figure. The scarecrow idea has been built upon numerous times, and not all visual scare devices are shaped like humans. The "Flashman Birdscarer," Iridescent tape, "TerrorEyes" balloons, and other visual deterrents are all built on the idea of visually scaring birds. This method doesn't work so well with all species, considering that some species frequently perch on scarecrows.
By analogy, people make monkey scarers to protect their cropland in Ethiopia.

Hawk kite

Many species of bird are also naturally afraid of predators such as birds of prey. "Hawk kites" are designed to fly from poles in the wind and hover above the field to be protected. They are shaped to match the silhouette of a bird of prey.

Helikites
The Helikite bird scarer is a lighter-than-air combination of a helium balloon and a kite. Helikites fly up to 200vft in the air with or without wind. Although they do not look like hawks, they fly and hover high in the sky behaving like birds of prey. Helikites successfully exploit bird pests' instinctive fear of hawks and can reliably protect large areas of farmland.

Lasers
The use of lasers can be an effective method of bird scaring, although there is some evidence to suggest some birds are "laser-resistant". As the effectiveness of the laser decreases with increasing light levels, it is likely to be most effective at dawn and dusk. Although some lasers prove to be effective during daylight hours.

The method relies on birds being startled by the strong contrast between the ambient light and the laser beam. During low light conditions this technique is very selective and can be attuned to frequencies and wavelengths that individual bird species don't like, but at night the light beam is visible over a large distance and can cause widespread (non-species specific) disturbance. Lasers use can be limited due to safety concerns of the beam and some nations have laws which prohibit lasers above a certain power from being used. Lasers should be looked at as an additional scaring system to add to a wildlife management program.

Manually operated laser torches and automated laser bird deterrent robots that move the laser automatically towards the birds are available on the market.

Research conducted at Wageningen University shows the potential of laser technology to prevent the spreading of Avian Influenza. When the laser was used at a poultry farm, a 99.7% wild bird reduction rate was recorded.

Dead birds
The use of model or actual dead birds is used to signal danger to others. Initially, birds often approach the corpse but usually leave when they see the unnatural position of the bird. This approach has been frequently used in attempts to deter gulls from airports. Pheasant feed sacks often have an image of an owl with large eyes so that when empty they can be strung up to scare predators.

Balloons

Balloons are an inexpensive deterrent. However, this method relies on the movement of balloons, which is something that birds can become used to.
The addition of eye illustrations on the balloons has been shown to increase this method's effectiveness as it combats the birds' ability to adapt. Commercially available "scare-eye" balloons have holographic eyes that follow birds wherever they go. The long-term effectiveness of this method can be increased by periodically moving the placement of the scare devices.

In the United Kingdom the use of balloons is subject to approval from the Civil Aviation Authority, especially around airfields.

Auditory scarers
Audible bird scarers use noise stimuli that makes birds uncomfortable. However, once birds realize these pose no real threats, they can easily become habituated to sounds that seemed initially frightening. If just being placed in situ and left, audible bird scarers can easily become ineffective bird control solutions, however when managed on an ongoing basis or used as part of a greater bird deterrent system, sound methods can deliver quality results.

Sōzu (shishi odoshi)
One very old design is the Japanese sōzu, known metonymically as a shishi odoshi (although the term shishi odoshi properly refers to any method of scaring wild animals, including the Western scarecrow).  Instead of using a visual method to distract pests, as the scarecrow does, it uses the sound of a heavy pipe repeatedly and rhythmically hitting a rock, using water as a timing device.  The sōzu is also used in Japanese popular culture to denote inordinate amounts of wealth, combined with a traditional sensibility: by design, the shishi odoshi uses copious amounts of water, meaning either a very high water bill, or that it is situated on high-value land with a stream or river running through it.

Propane cannons

Propane scare cannons are one of the most common types of bird scarer available in Europe and America. It is a propane-powered gas gun which produces a periodic explosion. The audible bang can reach very loud volumes, in excess of 150 decibels, causing a flight reaction in birds. The similarity between a scare cannon and a 12 gauge shotgun is thought to cause a startle/fear reaction, although it is also effective against birds that have not been exposed to hunting pressure.

Birds can become habituated to the sound of regular cannon detonations, especially if it does not vary in its magnitude, pitch, or time interval. However, regularly moving the cannon, utilizing on-demand firing options, including radio control, and combining cannons with other methods of deterrents can prevent habituation.

Propane scare cannons are very loud and can be disruptive to people living nearby. One study found that restricting cannon use to only hours when birds are active and incorporating better bird damage plans drastically reduced the number of complaints from neighbours.

Electronic repellers
Sonic bird repellers are not effective; the birds quickly acclimate to them.  Usually consisting of a central unit and several speakers, the system emits digitally recorded distress calls of birds, and, in some cases, calls of predators of the target species.  Some emitters randomize pitch, magnitude, time interval, sound sequence and other factors in an attempt to prevent birds from getting used to them.  Many of the sounds produced are regarded as annoying to people.

Ultrasonic scarers
Ultrasonic devices are static sound-emitting bird deterrents, which, in theory, will annoy birds to keep them away from enclosed or semi-enclosed areas. Ultrasonic scarers are not harmful to birds, however, there is debate around birds' ability to hear these frequencies at loud enough decibels.  Birds are believed to have similar hearing to humans, with studies showing birds do not hear on an ultrasonic level, meaning that ultrasonic scarers often have little or no effect in deterring birds.

Cartridge scarers
Cartridge scarers include a wide variety of noise-producing cartridges usually fired from rockets or rope bangers, or on aerodromes from modified pistols or shotguns, which produce a loud bang and emit flashes of light. They include shellcrackers, screamer shells and whistling projectiles, exploding projectiles, bird bangers and flares. Bird banger cartridges commonly use a low explosive known as flash powder.

Bird scaring cartridges can produce noise levels of up to 160 dB at varying ranges but in some countries both the cartridges and the gun require a firearms certificate.

Pyrotechnics have proved effective in dispersing birds at airports, landfill sites, agricultural crops and aquaculture facilities. At airports in the United Kingdom, shellcrackers fired from a modified pistol are the most common means of dispersing birds, as they allow the bird controller to have some directional control over birds in flight, so they can be steered away from runways.

However, as with all similar noises, there is a high risk of birds becoming used to any pyrotechnics or cartridge explosions.

Benign acoustic deterrence
In 2013, Dr. John Swaddle and Dr. Mark Hinders at the College of William and Mary created a new method of deterring birds using benign sounds projected by conventional and directional (parametric) speakers. The initial objectives of the technology were to displace problematic birds from airfields to reduce bird strike risks, minimize agricultural losses due to pest bird foraging, displace nuisance birds that cause extensive repair and chronic clean-up costs, and reduce bird mortality from flying into man-made structures. The sounds, referred to as a "Sonic Net," do not have to be loud and are a combination of wave forms—collectively called "colored noise"—forming non-constructive and constructive interference with how birds talk to each other.

Technically, the Sonic Net technology is not a bird scarer, but discourages birds from flying into or spending time in the target area. The impact on the birds is similar to talking in a crowded room, and since they cannot understand each other they go somewhere else. Early tests at an aviary and initial field trials at a landfill and airfield indicate that the technology is effective and that birds do not habituate to the sound.  The provisional and full patents were filed in 2013 and 2014 respectively, with further research and commercialization of the technology being ongoing.

Other

Humans
Historically, humans have been employed to scare birds from crops, using a variety of deterrents including throwing stones, flashing with mirrors, or operating noise devices. This is only cost-effective where the cost of labour is sufficiently low relative to agricultural profit margins. In Victorian England, children were employed to do this job. In the Huleh Valley in Northern Israel, rural labourers, primarily Arabs and Druze, use USVs and multiple devices to keep common cranes off high-value crops.

Dogs
The control of birds and other wildlife such as deer through harassment by trained border collies has been used at aerodromes, golf courses and agricultural land. The dogs represent an actual threat, and so elicit flight reactions. Habituation is unlikely as they can continually pursue and change their behaviour. Border collies are used as they are working dogs bred to herd animals and to avoid attack, and they respond well to whistle and verbal commands. A single border collie and its handler can keep an area of approximately 50 square kilometres (19.3 square miles, 4998.7 hectares, or 12,179.2 acres) free of larger birds and wildlife. However, although they are effective at deterring ground foraging birds such as waders and wildfowl, they are not so useful for species that spend most of their time flying or perching, such as raptors and swallows.

In 1999, Southwest Florida International Airport became the first commercial airport in the world to employ a border collie in an airfield wildlife control programme. After the use of the collie, numbers and species of birds on the airport declined and most birds that remained congregated in a drainage ditch away from the runway. The number of bird strikes dropped to zero compared to 13 for the same period the previous year. Several other airports and airbases have now started similar programmes.

At Dover Air Force Base, Delaware, bird strike damage to aircraft caused by birds has been reduced from an average of US$600,000 per year for the proceeding two years to US$24,000 per year after the initiation of a bird control programme that included the use of border collies.

Predators

Using predators as a natural bird deterrent has become a recommended form of controlling bird infestations. Specially selected species are trained to deal with working in un-natural environments with distractions and dangers they would not usually encounter.

The success of this method of bird control is based on the fact that many birds have a natural fear of falcons and hawks as predators, so their presence in the area encourages problem species to disperse. The natural reaction of most prey species is to form a flock and attempt to fly above the falcon. If this fails, they will attempt to fly for cover and leave the area.

Radio controlled aircraft
Radio-controlled model aircraft have been used to scare or 'haze' bird pests since the early 1980s, mainly over airfields, but have also been used over agricultural areas, fisheries and landfill sites. This method has been shown to be very effective and birds habituate more slowly to a treatment in which they are being actively hazed. At Whiteman Air Force Base, Missouri, balsa wood radio-controlled aircraft are one of the primary bird harassment methods used to keep the airfield clear of raptors and other large birds, and they have also proved effective at dispersing the base's redwing blackbird roost.

Fireworks
Fireworks can also be used as bird scarers, and some jurisdictions issue special licences for agricultural fireworks.  This practice has been criticised as a loophole for the sale of consumer fireworks. Again, the loud bangs can also irritate people living on nearby properties.

Combination scarers
These combine multiple deterrents, such as using a pop up scarecrow combined with a gas gun, which in turn activates the distress call of a bird. These combination scarers are often managed by computers and synchronised across an area via the use of radio links. This synchronisation becomes more effective if there is some kind of detection system involved such as bird detecting radar.

See also
Bird control
Bird control spike
Bird netting
Pigeon control
Bird trapping

References

Notes

External links
 NFU online Code of Practice for using bird scarers.

Bird pest control
Fear
Articles containing video clips